With Days Like This As Cheap As Chewing Gum, Why Would Anyone Want To Work? is the third offering from English indie band Hot Club De Paris. It was released on Moshi Moshi records on hand numbered limited 10" vinyl and digital formats.

Track listing
All of the videos of six songs maybe add all of the songs list on With Days Like This as Cheap as Chewing Gum, Why Would Anyone Want to Work?, he  produced by Amelia Robona.
Dance A Ragged Dance
Fuck You, The Truth!
Dog Tired At The Spring Dance Marathon
They Shoot Horses Don't They?
Noses Blazing
Extra Time, Sudden Death

References

Hot Club de Paris albums
2010 EPs